Four Loves is a 1965 Taiwanese film directed by Li Hsing, based on Chiung Yao's 1964 novelette Wan-chun's Three Loves. This was the first ever film based on Chiung Yao's fiction.

Cast
Tang Pao-yun as Hsia Wan-chun
Tse Ling-ling as Hsia Wan-chun (child)
Chiang Ming as Chou Po-chien
Yan Li as Chou Po-chien (child)
Wong Yung as Chou Chung-kang
Yu Chi-kung as Chou Chung-kang (child)
Feng Hai as Chou Shu-hao
Pa Ke as Chou Shu-hao (child)
Wei Su as Father Chou
Fuh Bih-huei as Mother Chou
Betty Ting Pei as Wan-chun's classmate
Ting Chiang as Teacher Huang
Pan Chieh-yi as She Ma

Awards
1966 Golden Horse Awards
Won—Best Child Star (Tse Ling-ling)

External links

Films based on works by Chiung Yao
Films directed by Li Hsing
Taiwanese romance films
Films set in Beijing
Films shot in Taiwan
1960s romance films